The 1902 New York state election was held on November 4, 1902, to elect the governor, the lieutenant governor, the Secretary of State, the state comptroller, the attorney general, the state treasurer, the state engineer and a judge of the New York Court of Appeals, as well as all members of the New York State Assembly and the New York State Senate.

History
The "Liberal Democratic" state convention met at Cooper Union in Manhattan. This party was composed of Bryan Democrats, Chicago Platform Democrats and former Populists which were fiercely opposed to Democratic boss David B. Hill. Judge Samuel Seabury was Permanent Chairman. They nominated Edgar L. Ryder for Governor; J. C. Corbin, of St. Lawrence County, for Lieutenant Governor; John B. Howarth, of Buffalo, for Secretary of State; De Myre S. Fero for Comptroller; Daniel B. Casley, of Westchester County, for Treasurer; Dennis Spellissey, of New York City, for Attorney General; John E. Dugan, of Albany County, for State Engineer; and Robert Stewart, of Brooklyn, for the Court of Appeals.

The Social Democratic state convention met on July 4 at 64, East Fourth Street in Manhattan. They nominated Benjamin Hanford for Governor; William Thurston Brown, of Rochester, for Lieutenant Governor; Leonard D. Abbott for Secretary of State; Gen. Lawrence Mayes, of New York City, for Attorney General; Warren Atkinson, of Brooklyn, for Comptroller; Joel Moses, of Rochester, for Treasurer; Everitt Holmes, of Peekskill, for State Engineer; and John F. Clarke, of New York City, for the Court of Appeals.

The Socialist Labor state convention met on August 30 at Utica, New York.

The Prohibition state convention met on September 5 at Saratoga Springs, New York. Alfred L. Manierre, of New York City, was Temporary Chairman until the choice of Alphonso A. Hopkins as Permanent Chairman. They nominated Manierre for Governor; Alfred A. Hartman, of Albion, for Lieutenant Governor; Alden W. Young, of Oswego, for Secretary of State; Samuel Mitchell, of Hornellsville, for Treasurer; James McNeil, of Hudson, for Comptroller; Emmett F. Smith for State Engineer; Erwin J. Baldwin, of Elmira, for the Court of Appeals; and endorsed Democrat John Cunneen for Attorney General.

The Republican state convention met on September 23 and 24 at Saratoga Springs. Timothy E. Ellsworth was Permanent Chairman. Governor Benjamin B. Odell, Jr., was re-nominated after a roll call in which all votes were cast for him. All other state officers were nominated by acclamation.

The Democratic state convention met on September 30 and October 1 at Saratoga Springs. Martin W. Littleton was Permanent Chairman.

Result
Six Republicans and two Democrats were elected in a tight race.

The incumbents Odell, Miller, Bond and Gray were re-elected.

28 Republicans and 22 Democrats were elected to a two-year term (1903–04) in the New York State Senate.

89 Republicans and 61 Democrats were elected for the session of 1903 to the New York State Assembly.

The Republican, Democratic, Social Democratic, Prohibition and Socialist Labor parties maintained automatic ballot status (necessary 10,000 votes for Governor).

Obs.: "Blank and scattering" votes: 8,901 (Judge), 8,737 (Attorney), 6,632 (Governor)

Notes

Sources
The tickets: Elections in Forty-Two States Nov. 4 in NYT on October 19, 1902
Result: THE VOTE IN NOVEMBER in NYT on December 10, 1902
Result: STATE CANVASSERS MEET TO-DAY in NYT on December 12, 1902 [the numbers differ slightly from the ones published two days earlier]
Result: The Tribune Almanac 1903
The New York Red Book 1903

See also
 New York gubernatorial elections

Further reading
 McCormick, Richard L. From Realignment to Reform: Political Change in New York State 1893-1910 (Cornell University Press, 1981).
 Wesser, Robert F. "Theodore Roosevelt: Reform and Reorganization of the Republican Party in New York, 1901-1906." New York History 46.3 (1965): 230-252 online.

1902
 
New York